The Credit Union Classic presented by Wegmans was an annual golf tournament for professional women golfers on the Symetra Tour, the LPGA's developmental tour. The event was  played from 1996 to 2014 in the Syracuse, New York area.

The title sponsors were three central New York-based credit unions: Empower Federal Credit Union, SEFCU, and The Summit Federal Credit Union. The presenting sponsor was Wegmans, a supermarket chain headquartered in Rochester, New York.

The last benefiting charity from the Credit Union Classic was The First Tee of Syracuse, Inc.

Tournament names through the years: 
1996–1997: Loretto Futures Golf Classic
1998–2000: Fleet Loretto Futures Golf Classic
2001–2005: M&T Bank Loretto Futures Golf Classic
2006–2011: Alliance Bank Golf Classic
2012–2014: Credit Union Classic presented by Wegmans

Winners

*Tournament shortened to 36 holes because of rain.

Tournament records

References

External links
Coverage on the Symetra Tour's official site

Former Symetra Tour events
Golf in Syracuse, New York
Events in Syracuse, New York